Castletown Cox, or Castletown House, is a restored Palladian mansion and demesne located in County Kilkenny, Ireland.

Design
Davis Ducart designed the three storey over basement, seven bay building in the Palladian style. The design was commissioned by the Lord Archbishop of Cashel, The Most Reverend Michael Cox in 1767. Buckingham House in London inspired some of the details.

Restoration
The house was extensively restored in the early 21st century by George Magan, Baron Magan of Castletown. The house and 513 acres of land was offered for sale in 2017 and sold in 2018. In 2019, Lord Magan was evicted from Castletown Cox for failure to make rental payments of €100,000 per annum to the trust he had placed the estate into.

The estate
The formal gardens were designed by the Dowager Marchioness of Salisbury. The National Inventory of Architectural Heritage lists the grounds as having the main features substantially present (ref. KK-75-S-428257). Also listed on the estate are two gate lodges of special architectural interest, one a gothic styled three bay home from 1911, the other a two bay home c 1825. Both gateways from c 1825 are also listed as being of special artistic and architectural interest. The farmyard, farm managers house and remains of an ice house  are all listed as being of special architectural interest.

References

Palladian architecture in Ireland
Buildings and structures in County Kilkenny
Houses in the Republic of Ireland
Gardens in County Kilkenny